The Grumman F-14 Tomcat is an American jet fighter aircraft.

F14, F.XIV, F.14 or F-14 may also refer to:

 Fokker F.XIV, a 1920s Dutch cargo plane
 Fokker F-14, a 1929 American transport aircraft 
 Ferrari F14 T, a Formula One racing car
 Farmall F-14, a model of Farmall tractor
 Fluorine-14 (F-14 or 14F), an isotope of fluorine
 F14, a former Swedish Air Force Base, now Halmstad Airport